The 1975 Middle Tennessee Blue Raiders football team represented Middle Tennessee State University—as a member of the Ohio Valley Conference (OVC) during the 1975 NCAA Division II football season. Led by first-year head coach Ben Hurt, the Blue Raiders compiled a record an overall record of 4–7 with a mark of 3–4 in conference play. The team's captains were Boyd, Emert,  and Woodfork.

Schedule

References

Middle Tennessee
Middle Tennessee Blue Raiders football seasons
Middle Tennessee Blue Raiders football